G.Venkataswamy Naidu College(Autonomous), Kovilpatti (G.V.N. College) is a general degree college in Kovilpatti, Thoothukudi district, Tamil Nadu. It was established in 1966. The college is affiliated with Manonmaniam Sundaranar University. It offers courses in arts, commerce, and science.

Departments

Science
Physics
Chemistry
Mathematics
Computer Science
Electrics
Statistics
Plant Bio Technology(Botony) 
Information Technology

Arts and Commerce
Tamil
English
Economics
Commerce

Accreditation
The college is recognized by the University Grants Commission (UGC).

See also
Education in India
Literacy in India
List of educational institutions in Thoothukudi district
List of institutions of higher education in Tamil Nadu

References

External links
http://www.gvncollege.org

Educational institutions established in 1966
1966 establishments in Madras State
Colleges affiliated to Manonmaniam Sundaranar University
Universities and colleges in Thoothukudi district